Gaston Thomas LeBlanc (August 1, 1941 – February 15, 1980) was a Canadian politician. He represented the electoral district of Richmond in the Nova Scotia House of Assembly from 1974 to 1980. He was a member of the Nova Scotia Liberal Party.

Born in 1941 in West Arichat, Nova Scotia, LeBlanc graduated from the Nova Scotia Technical College with an engineering degree. LeBlanc entered provincial politics in the 1974 election, winning the Richmond riding by over 1500 votes. He was re-elected in 1978. LeBlanc died in office on February 15, 1980.

References

1941 births
1980 deaths
Nova Scotia Liberal Party MLAs
People from Richmond County, Nova Scotia